Punta Delgada is a locality and tourist resort on the Valdes Peninsula in Biedma Department in the north of the province of Chubut, Argentina. It is situated on the Golfo Nuevo.

The main attractions are a colony of elephant seals and an active lighthouse built in 1905. The buildings around the lighthouse have been converted into a hotel and restaurant, to accommodate visitors to the area. The  cast-iron lighthouse tower contains a Fresnel lens, which emits a pattern of three white flashes every twenty-five seconds.

References

External links
 Puerto Pirámides - images
 Federal Site Ifam

Populated places in Chubut Province
Tourist attractions in Chubut Province